Kuzhuvelil Varkey Mathew (born 2 November 1931) is an Indian biblical scholar and a member of the Society for Biblical Studies in India.

Education
Kuzhuvelil Varkey Mathew was born in Keezhuvaipur in Kerala to Rachel and K. T. Varkey.  Mathew studied at the local CMS High School in Mallapally in Pathanamthitta District and later underwent pre-university studies at the CMS College in Kottayam.

After Mathew evinced interest in pursuing studies in divinity, the Malankara Mar Thoma Syrian Church then headed by Juhanon Mar Thoma (Mar Thoma XVIII) sent him to Serampore College, Serampore where he pursued graduate studies in theology from 1951 to 1954. The Malankara Mar Thoma Syrian Church ordained Mathew as a Clergy in 1955. He was made Vicar in Mylom.  After briefly donning the pastoral role, Mathew was sent again to Serampore College from 1956 to 1957. He then studied at the United Theological College, Bengaluru in the ensuing academic year to pursue post-graduate studies in Biblical Studies leading to M. Th. in Old Testament thereby becoming the first Indian to pursue a post-graduate course in Old Testament under the Senate of Serampore College (University), a State University of the Government of West Bengal and recognised by the University Grants Commission under Section 2 (f) of the University Grants Commission Act, 1956.  Mathew studied Old Testament under the Old Testament specialist, Professor Norman Henry Snaith, then a visiting professor at the seminary in Bengaluru, and worked out a thesis using the Septuagint.

From 1958 to 1960 Mathew was Vicar of the Mar Thoma Parish in Calcutta.

Career
Mathew began teaching Old Testament in Serampore College, a constituent College of the Senate of Serampore College (University), Serampore beginning from the academic year 1960 till 1971 when his parent Church, the Malankara Mar Thoma Syrian Church recalled him to Kottayam for teaching in the Mar Thoma Theological Seminary.  Paulose Mar Paulose, D. S. Satyaranjan, G. Babu Rao, S. Jeyapaul David and James Massey were few of the students of K. V. Mathew.  One of his old students, G. Babu Rao returned to Serampore to teach Old Testament from 1974.  Mathew's teaching colleagues included Y. D. Tiwari and others.

Starting from the academic year 1971–1972, Mathew began teaching Old Testament in the Mar Thoma Theological Seminary, Kottayam.  In 1981, he was made Principal of the Mar Thoma Theological Seminary and continued in that position till 1986.

Mathew was also on the panel of Professors under the Federated Faculty for Research in Religion and Culture (FFRRC), Kerala and served as a guide to post-graduate and doctoral students.  In 2000, K. V. Mathew was invited by the Mar Thoma Syrian Church of Malabar (Delhi Diocese) to serve as the Principal of Dharma Jyoti Vidyapeeth {affiliated to the Senate of Serampore College (University)}, Faridabad.  Mathew held the reins of this institution in Faridabad till 2002.

After two decades of teaching in the Seminary in Kottayam, Mathew was made the Secretary of the Malankara Mar Thoma Syrian Church in 1987 continuing till 1990 under Metropolitan Alexander Mar Thoma (Mar Thoma XIX).

The Society for Biblical Studies in India was constituted by Biblical Scholars to foster Biblical scholarship in relation to the Indian context.   Mathew also served as an office-bearer of the SBSI.  He was twice elected as its president in 1983 and 1994.

Research
Mathew did original research on the Psalms at the University of Edinburgh, Scotland.

Mathew edited the One-Volume Bible Commentary in Malayalam. He worked with Chief Editor E. C. John.

Publications
 Ancient Religions of the Fertile Crescent and the Sanatana Dharma
 Trinity-Semantic Considerations
 The Concept of God and Nature in the Psalms
 The Hermeneutical Struggle in India
 Indigenisation: An Old Testament Perspective
 The faith and practice of the Mar Thoma Church
 Walking humbly with God : A Biography of the Rev. C. E. Abraham
 Ecological Perspectives in the Book of Psalms
 Crisis and Hope in Israel's Exile
 Dr. M. M. Thomas – A Grateful Memory
 Last Supper – A Kingdom Perspective
 Ecology and Faith in the Old Testament

Higher studies
While teaching Old Testament in Serampore College, Mathew proceeded to the University of Edinburgh, Scotland in the academic year 1962 to 1963 and enrolled to pursue doctoral studies in the field of Old Testament under Professors G. W. Anderson, N. W. Porteous and R. E. Clements, who were then teaching at the University of Edinburgh.  Between 1964 and 1968, Mathew returned to Serampore College, Serampore to take up his teaching assignments.  He left the college again in 1968–1969 to spend a year at the University of Hamburg, Germany under Klaus Koch.  In the final phase of his doctoral research, he spent the final academic year (1969-1970) at the University of Edinburgh, Scotland and submitted a thesis on the topic God and Nature in the Book of Psalms thereby becoming the first Indian to be awarded a doctorate by the Faculty of Theology of the University of Edinburgh, Scotland.

Visiting scholar
After leaving the Seminary in Kottayam in 1994, Mathew spent three years as a Vicar of the Parish in Ranni.  In 1997, he was Visiting Professor at the Aizawl Theological College, Aizawl.  In 1999 and 2008, he was a guest professor at his alma mater in Serampore.  From 2000 to 2002 he took up the principalship of Dharma Jyoti Vidyapeeth in Faridabad.

See also
 Y. D. Tiwari
 Klaus Koch
 S. J. Samartha

References
Notes

Further reading

External links
 "Churches Hope to Reunite India's Legacy of the Apostle Thomas" – Christianity Today
 "The Great Hill Stations of Asia, Volume 1998" – Google Books

1931 births
Living people
Old Testament scholars
Christian clergy from Kottayam
Indian Christian theologians
Indian biblical scholars
Indian lecturers
Mar Thoma Syrian Church
Malayali people
Alumni of the University of Edinburgh
Senate of Serampore College (University) alumni
Academic staff of the Senate of Serampore College (University)
Syriac Orthodox clergy